Levent Şahin (born 20 September 1973) is a Turkish former football player, and the current assistant manager of Galatasaray.

Playing career
Levent was born in Edremit. He was an amateur footballer, playing for Yeni Yolspor and Şekerbank Ankara.

Managerial career
Levent began his managerial career as the assistant for Ankaragücü. He was the assistant coach for various teams in the lower divisions of Turkey, before gaining his first head coach experience at Bugsaşspor in 2009 for the TFF Second League. He became the coach for various youth team for the Turkish Football Federation in 2012, and then became an assistant coach for the senior Turkey national football team in 2016. in January 2017, Levent became the head coach for Adanaspor in the Süper Lig, simultaneously remaining assistant coach for the Turkish national team. He left this job on 9 April 2017. In December 2017, Levent became the assistant coach for Galatasaray.

References

External links
Levent TFF Manager profile
Leven Mackolik profile

1973 births
Living people
People from Edremit, Balıkesir
Turkish footballers
Turkish football managers
Süper Lig managers
Adanaspor managers
Association footballers not categorized by position
Galatasaray S.K. (football) non-playing staff